Nagaokakyō, Kyoto, held an election for the city assembly on October 2, 2005. Independents won the most seats while the Japanese Communist Party gathered most party votes.

Results

|-
! style="background-color:#E9E9E9;text-align:left;" |Parties
! style="background-color:#E9E9E9;text-align:right;" |Votes
! style="background-color:#E9E9E9;text-align:right;" |%
! style="background-color:#E9E9E9;text-align:right;" |Seats
|-
| style="text-align:left;" |Japanese Communist Party (日本共産党, Nihon Kyōsan-tō)
| style="text-align:right;" | 6,538
| style="text-align:right;" | 
| style="text-align:right;" | 6
|-
| style="text-align:left;" |New Komeito Party (公明党, Kōmeitō)
| style="text-align:right;" | 4,435
| style="text-align:right;" | 
| style="text-align:right;" | 4
|-
| style="text-align:left;" |Democratic Party of Japan (民主党, Minshutō)
| style="text-align:right;" | 3,205
| style="text-align:right;" | 
| style="text-align:right;" | 2
|-
| style="text-align:left;" |Liberal Democratic Party (自由民主党, Jiyū Minshutō)
| style="text-align:right;" | 1,955
| style="text-align:right;" | 
| style="text-align:right;" | 1
|-
| style="text-align:left;" | Independents
| style="text-align:right;" | 17,902
| style="text-align:right;" | 
| style="text-align:right;" | 13
|-
|style="text-align:left;background-color:#E9E9E9"|Total (turnout 55.18 %)
|width="75" style="text-align:right;background-color:#E9E9E9"| 34,398
|width="30" style="text-align:right;background-color:#E9E9E9"| 100.00
|width="30" style="text-align:right;background-color:#E9E9E9"| 26
|-
| style="text-align:left;" colspan=4 |Source:
|}

2005 elections in Japan
Nagaokakyō
October 2005 events in Japan